The Bonn Agreement of July 2, 1931 is a formal affirmation which established full communion between the Church of England and the Old Catholic churches of the Union of Utrecht, including the Old Catholic Church of the Netherlands. While it allowed bilateral participation in sacraments, it does not require from either the acceptance of all doctrinal opinions. This communion has since been extended to all churches of the Anglican Communion through their synods.

Principles
The agreement expresses three principles:

 Each communion recognizes the catholicity and independence of the other and maintains its own.
 Each communion agrees to admit members of the other communion to participate in the sacraments.
 Full communion does not require from either communion the acceptance of all doctrinal opinion, sacramental devotion or liturgical practice characteristic of the other, but implies that each believes the other to hold all the essentials of the Christian faith.

To monitor the progressive growing together of the two communions, the Anglican-Old Catholic International Co-ordinating Council was established by the International Bishops' Conference and the Lambeth Conference. Its first official meeting took place in 1999.

Bibliography
 Affirmation of the 1931 Bonn Agreement between old Catholics and Anglicans. Accepted by the Synod of Bishops of the Old Catholic Confederation. October 26, 2013.
 Bonn Agreement. Historical Dictionary of Anglicanism: Historical Dictionaries of Religions, Philosophies, and Movements Series. Author: Colin Buchanan. Edition: 2. Publisher: Rowman & Littlefield, 2015. Pages 105-106. . 
 Caruso, Robert W. Celebrating Communion: An Old Catholic and Episcopal Paradigm of the Local Church in North America. 2012. 
 Commission of the Anglican Communion and the Old Catholic Churches. Report of the Meeting of the Commission of the Anglican Communion and the Old Catholic Churches Held at Bonn on Thursday, July 2, 1931. London: Society for Promoting Christian Knowledge, 1931. 
 Emhardt, William Chauncey. Old Catholics Are Essential to Reunion. New York, N.Y.: National Council, Protestant Episcopal Church, 1931. 
 Emhardt, William Chauncey. Thoughts on the Anglican Communion and Reunion: Four Articles. New York: National Council [of the] Protestant Episcopal Church, 1930. Contents: I. Strides toward reunion at Lambeth.--Old Catholics are essential to reunion.--III. The nature of the Anglican Communion.--IV. The enlarging horizon of our Communion. 
 Gauthier, L. Pour le 25e anniversaire de l'intercommunion anglicane et vieille-catholique. [Place of publication not identified]: [publisher not identified], 1956. http://www.worldcat.org/oclc/60492752
 Huelin, Gordon. Old Catholics and Anglicans, 1931-1981. Oxford University Press, 1983. "To commemorate the fiftieth anniversary of intercommunion." 
 Richard J. Mammana Jr. (editor), Intercommunion between the Episcopal Church and the Polish National Catholic Church: An Introduction and Sourcebook (Resica Falls: Project Canterbury, 2022) 
 Maan, P. J., and J. Visser. 1931-1981: vijftig jaren full communion tussen de Anglikaanse en Oud-Katholieke Kerken. Amersfoort: Oud-Katholiek Seminarie, 1982. 
 Neuhoff, Klaus Heinrich. Building on the Bonn Agreement: An Historical Study of Anglican-Old Catholic Relations Before and After the 1931 Bonn Agreement with Special Reference to the Anglican-Old Catholic Theologians' Conferences 1957-2005. Amersfoort: Stichting Oud-Katholiek Seminarie, 2010. Contents: 	Introduction—History of the Bonn Agreement—Text and ratification of the Bonn Agreement --'Pre-history': the Church of England and the See of Utrecht—Since Vatican I : the establishment of further Old Catholic Churches—The Bonn Agreement (1931) --Problems relating to the Bonn Agreement—Anglican-Old Catholic theologians' conferences—Introduction—Overlapping jurisdictions—Ecumenical dialogues—Full doctrinal agreement? Orthodox churches—Universal jurisdiction iure divino? Roman Catholic Church—Eucharistic hospitality? Protestant churches—Ordination of women—Considerations for today. 
 Rein, Harald. Kirchengemeinschaft: die anglikanisch-altkatholisch-orthodoxen Beziehungen von 1870 bis 1990 und ihre ökumenische Relevanz. Bern: P. Lang, 1993. Bd. 1. Allgemeine Einführung: die anglikanisch-altkatholischen Beziehungen.-- Bd. 2. Die anglikanisch-orthodoxen Beziehungen, Die orthodox-altkatholischen Beziehungen, Das ekklesiologische Selbstverstä̇ndnis und die Beziehungen dieser drei zu anderen Kirchen. 
 Reunion Conference, and F. H. Reusch. Bericht über die am 14., 15. und 16. September zu Bonn gehaltenen Unions-Conferenzen, im Auftrage des Vorsitzenden Dr. von Döllinger. Bonn: P. Neusser, 1874. 
 Rodzina tygodnik katolicki: numer specialny : nr 44 (1106). Waszawa: [publisher not identified], 1981. .

See also

 Willibrord Society

References

Old Catholicism
Anglican ecumenism
1931 in Christianity
20th century in Bonn
July 1931 events
1931 in Germany
1930s in Prussia
1931 documents